XHOBS-FM is a radio station on 92.1 FM in Ciudad Obregón, Sonora, Mexico.

History
XEOBS-AM 1070 received its concession on March 11, 1988. It was a daytime-only station owned by Radiorama subsidiary Futuro Sonoro, S.A. It migrated to FM in 2011, and soon after, Radiorama largely exited Sonora and leasing its stations to Grupo Larsa Comunicaciones.

In April 2018, Larsa ditched the Xtasis English classic hits format for pop using the Arroba FM brand owned by Radiorama.

On June 4, 2019, ISA Corporativo, an outdoor advertising company, entered broadcasting by assuming operations of XHOBS and XHAP-FM 96.9. It immediately flipped XHOBS to La Ke Buena format from Televisa Radio and instituted a new news service powered by the Diario del Yaqui and Diario del Mayo newspapers.

ISA ceased radio operations throughout the state of Sonora on December 31, 2021. A new format under direct Radiorama management, known as Con Madre, was debuted in February 2022. Con Madre moved to XHAP-FM in June 2022 to allow Radiovisa to take over operations of the two stations, with the La Que Manda brand already used by Radiovisa in Guaymas (XHGYS-FM) and Caborca (XHIB-FM) placed on XHOBS. 3 days later they undo the changes and return to Con madre, ending La Que Manda.

References

Radio stations in Sonora